India's Ultimate Warrior is a reality television show produced by Base Films. Famous Bollywood actor and Martial Artist Vidyut Jamwal is Dojo Master in the show. This show is based on a complete Warrior theme, as its setup is an ancient Martial Arts Dojo, where 16 elite fighters and athletes selected from across India will demonstrate their skills to prove that they are the ultimate warrior. All participants will go through a variety of challenges to prove their skills.

Along with Dojo Master Vidyut Jamwal there are 4 mentors from all across the world, who will be mentoring the selected contestants. The reality show was shot at the Empower Activity Camps in Kolad, near Pune, Maharashtra.

Series overview

Plot 
Vidyut Jammwal assembles 16 elite athletes and fighters from across India to compete for the title. In the first leg of their journey, they are tested on their Control, Fear and Skill. 2 eliminated and 1 is crowned.

Mentors 

 Bi Nguyen - Pro MMA fighter
 Mykel Hawke - Special Forces Veteran
 Shaun Kober - Combat Veteran
 Shifu Kanishka - Shaolin Kungfu Grandmaster

Contestants 

 Rohit Choudhary - Pro Boxer
 Deepak Mali - Parkour Athlete
 Haleema Momin - Stunt Rider
 Pooja Yadav - Taekwondo Athlete
 Muntazir Ahmad - MMA Athlete
 Deepak Rao - Strongman
 Deepak Sharma - Body Builder 
 Dinesh Shetty - Boxer
 Lekha Jambaulikar - Powerlifting Athlete
 Pearl Monteiro - Calisthenics Athlete
 Sandeep Chauhan - Taekwondo Athlete
 Abhishek Mishra - Professional Runner
 Rounak Gulia - Professional Wrestler
 Suchika Tariyal - Judo Athlete
 Prakram Dandona - Pro MMA Fighter
 Yogesh Kshatriya - Shaolin Kungfu Practitioner

Teams 

   Team Shifu
 Deepak Rao
 Deepak Mali
 Sandeep Chauhan
 Rounak Gulia
  Team Killer Bi
 Haleema Momin
 Muntazir Ahmad
 Prakram Dandona
 Pearl Montero
  Team Shaun
 Rohit Choudhary
 Suchika Tariyal
 Pooja Yadav
 Abhishek Mishra
  Team Hawke
 Lekha Jambaulikar
 Yogesh Kshatriya
 Deepak Sharma
 Dinesh Shetty

Episodes

Guests

References

External links 
 
 India's Ultimate Warrior on Discovery Plus
 India's Ultimate Warrior on Prime Video

Indian reality television series
2022 Indian television series debuts